Janiabad (also Romanized as Jānīābād) is a village in Khvajehei Rural District, Meymand District, Firuzabad County, Fars Province, Iran. At the 2006 census, its population was 233, in 47 families.

References 

Populated places in Firuzabad County